Ferari Mon: Unplugged Live is a live album by Bangladeshi rock band LRB. It was released on September 15, 1996 by Soundtek Electronics. The album features an acoustic performance recorded at Kinnari Restaurant in Dhaka on January 8, 1996. It also features Sunil Chandra Das, who plays violin in the album. It was the first live album by any Bangladeshi artist and the only live album of LRB.

Track listing 

Side A:
 "এখন অনেক রাত (It's Late at Night)" – 7:46
 "ফেরারী মন (Mind)" – 6:03
 "চলো বদলে যাই (Let's Change)" – 7:21
 "শেষ চিঠি (Last Letter)" – 7:05
 "স্মৃতি নিয়ে (With Memories)" – 4:31

Side B:
 "গতকাল রাতে (Last Night)" – 5:41
 "Pension" – 3:29
 "রুপালী গিটার (Silver Guitar)" – 5:33
 "মাধবী (Madhavi)" – 8:05
 "Bangladesh" – 5:26

Personnel 

Love Runs Blind
 Ayub Bachchu – lead vocals, acoustic guitars 
 S.I. Tutul – acoustic guitars, keyboards
 Saidul Hasan Swapan – bass guitars 
 Riyad – drums and percussion 
 Sunil Chandra Das – violin

Production
 Ayub Bachchu – production
 Azam Babu – sound engineering and mixing

References 

1996 live albums
Love Runs Blind albums